The first cabinet of Thabo Mbeki was the cabinet of the government of South Africa from 18 June 1999 until 29 April 2004.

History
Following his election for a first term as president, Thabo Mbeki announced his Cabinet on 17 June 1999.

This Cabinet was replaced on 29 April 2004 by Mbeki's second cabinet.

Cabinet

References

Government of South Africa
Executive branch of the government of South Africa
Cabinets of South Africa
1999 establishments in South Africa
2004 disestablishments in South Africa
Cabinets established in 1999
Cabinets disestablished in 2004